TY.O is the third studio album by British record producer and recording artist Taio Cruz which features special guest appearances from Flo Rida, Pitbull, David Guetta and Ludacris. Taking a more electronic music sound than his previous releases, TY.O was released in December 2011 by Universal Island Records but for reasons unknown to Cruz, its British and American release were held off. Instead, a year after its original release, an extended play (EP) version of the album titled The Fast Hits was released in the UK on 16 December 2012.

TY.O features a range of top-twenty and top-thirty singles including "Hangover" (featuring Flo Rida), "Troublemaker", "There She Goes" (usually featuring Pitbull), the limited release "World in Our Hands" and "Fast Car" which features on the German Special Edition and Fast Hits EP versions of the album. The album itself reached top-twenty in Switzerland and top-thirty in Germany, considerably less successful than Cruz's previous albums.

Background
Cruz began recording his third studio album in late 2010, where he rumoured that he would be exploring other musical genres for the album, including dubstep and rock anthems. In March 2011, Cruz premiered an all-new song, entitled "Telling the World", which was co-written by himself and Alan Kasiyre for the Rio soundtrack. The track was not featured on any of Cruz's prior studio albums. On 23 May 2011, Cruz received his first Billboard Music Award in the United States, and announced live on stage that his third album would be released in the fourth quarter of 2011, and would be entitled Black and Leather.

In June 2011, Cruz released the collaborative single "Little Bad Girl", with French DJ David Guetta and American rapper Ludacris. The song was relatively successful, reaching top-ten in charts around the world. In an interview, Cruz promised a "fun" and "energetic" album. The album's title was later changed to TY.O as Cruz believed it would help those who mispronounced his name.

A year later in June 2012, Cruz confirmed he was unsure of when TY.O would be released in the UK or US, commenting that it was a "big label decision" and out of his hands. Speaking on how TY.O differs from previous album Rockstarr (2010), Cruz told Digital Spy, "Rokstarr had a lot more rockier songs on it, apart from the singles. This album is a lot more electro-driven."

On 30 September 2014, the album was finally released to American digital markets.

Critical reception
Dave Rosin of Bestfan gave the album the following positive review: "British star Taio Cruz is back with his third album, TY.O, which in just the space of eleven tracks, has tried to create one of the most sensational albums of the year. Cruz has now established himself as one of the world's most sought after writers and producers, as well as a genuine international superstar artist in his own right. The scorching lead single from the album, "Hangover", features the vocal talent of Flo Rida, whilst the second single, "Troublemaker", is an amazing solo effort. "Troublemaker" is a fantastic song from start to finish - it will make you want to dance. Its catchy rhythm is able to give a hint what the whole album really offers its listeners. The song, produced by Dr. Luke, is based on a trip to the world's greatest party island. Other artist collaborations include Pitbull on "There She Goes", as well as Ludacris and David Guetta on "Little Bad Girl"."

Singles
 "Hangover" was chosen as the album's lead single in Australia, Germany and the United States, where it was released on 4 October 2011, and as the album's second single in the United Kingdom, where it was released on 4 March 2012. The song features vocals from American rapper Flo Rida and peaked at number 27 on the UK Singles Chart.
 "Troublemaker" was chosen as the album's second single in Australia and Germany, where it was released on 11 November 2011, and as the album's lead single in the UK, where it was released on 1 January 2012. The track peaked at number 3 on the UK Singles Chart, number 10 on the ARIA Singles Chart, and number 6 on the German Singles Chart.
 "There She Goes" was chosen as the album's third single in Germany and the UK, being released on 20 April 2012 in Germany and on 25 June 2012 in the UK. The track features vocals from American rapper Pitbull. The track peaked at number 12 on the UK Singles Chart, number 5 on the German Singles Chart and number 40 on the Irish Singles Chart.
 "World in Our Hands" was chosen as the album's fourth single in Germany, and was released on 27 July 2012. The song serves as the official single for German television station ZDF's coverage of the 2012 Summer Olympics in London. The music video features footage from the 2008 games in Beijing, intertwined with performance footage of Cruz.
 "Fast Car", officially impacted American mainstream radio on 14 August 2012. It features on the UK extended play (EP) version of the album, The Fast Hits and on the German Special Edition.
Taio Cruz performed "Positive" live on American Idol in 2012.

Track listing

The Fast Hits EP 

An extended play featuring songs from TY.O called The Fast Hits EP, was released on 16 December 2012. The EP features Cruz's 2010 single "Dynamite" plus singles "Fast Car", "Troublemaker", "Hangover" (with Flo Rida) and "There She Goes" (with Pitbull). It also features four other songs: "World in Our Hands", two remixes of "Fast Car" and one remix of "Dynamite".

Charts

Weekly charts

Monthly charts

Year-end charts

Release history

References 

2011 albums
Taio Cruz albums
Albums produced by Cirkut
Albums produced by Dr. Luke
Albums produced by David Guetta
Albums produced by Rami Yacoub
Albums produced by RedOne